A helmet is an article of protective headgear.

Helmet or The Helmet may also refer to:

Arts and entertainment 
Helmet (band), an American alternative metal band
Helmet (film), a 2021 Indian comedy film
Helmet (Game & Watch), a 1981 video game
"Helmet" (New Girl), a 2016 television episode
"The Helmet" (The Amazing World of Gumball), a 2012 television episode

Places 
Helmet, Virginia, US
Helmet Airport, British Columbia, Canada
Helmet Peak (disambiguation), several peaks
The Helmet (mountain), Montana, US
The Helmet (Oceanus Procellarum), a geological feature on the Moon

Other uses 
Helmet (heraldry), an element of a coat of arms
Helmet pigeon, a variety of fancy pigeon
Helsinki Metropolitan Area Libraries (HelMet), a library network in Finland

See also